Pirlo is an alcoholic drink, usually served as an apéritif, historically originated in the province of Brescia, in the North of Italy.
It is made with still white wine and Campari. Pirlo is served in a long stem glass with a typical balloon shape.
It is the typical and traditional apéritif of the province of Brescia.

History 
There are three different hypotheses on the origin of the pirlo, all of which belong to the oral traditions of local people.
According to the first but less credible hypothesis, pirlo would have already existed before today’s ingredients even existed (Campari or later Aperol). It was done by mixing white wine with vermouth and this used to be called dirty white, as claimed by elder local clients of historic taverns in the city centre.
The second theory claims that pirlo appeared in the province of Brescia after WW2. The theory is consistent with the timing of the spread of both Campari and Aperol, the latter not becoming popular until after WW2. 
According to the third and last hypothesis, the pirlo was born around the end of the 19th century. As peasants were poor, they could not afford wine with a high alcoholic content. Therefore, after diluting wine with water, they would add bitters or vermouth to liven up the flavour and make the drink more alcoholic.
Nowadays, pirlo is served with Campari in every bar or club in the province of Brescia. The trend of the happy hour has also introduced the use of Aperol, with a lower alcoholic content and less complex, instead of the Campari. 
According to the tradition of the province of Brescia, still white wine is used instead of the prosecco, that did not obviously exist in the area during the 1950s and whose current use constitutes the most relevant difference between pirlo bresciano and Spritz Veneziano. 
The slice of orange and the ice are 'fashionable' additions that do not certainly belong to the ancient Brescia tradition – the lemon peel belonged to the rule instead. Moreover, in the past, taverns in Brescia served pirlo in glasses very different from today's, made of thick, small glass, tulip-shaped with a small stem or, more simply, the classic bar tumbler.
Even though sparkling white wine and/or seltz have become over time the “classic” ingredients, the tradition would use still white wine and sparkling water instead to make the drink fizzier. This recipe was used until the end of 1970s in the province and until the 1980s in many taverns in the small towns, while some luxury bar of the city centre could afford seltzer. 
In the inns, the pirlo was also called 'bianc con l'amaro' (literally ‘white with bitter’) where 'bianc' stood for white wine and 'bitter' was the bitter, almost always Campari.

Current days 
As previously said, the pirlo was originally made with still white wine and Campari, sparkling water (or seltzer in luxury bars) was then added around 1970s in order to liven up the taste. Afterwards, sparkling white wine and Aperol started to be used.
Nowadays, there are two different ways to prepare a pirlo, except for the bitter part, which is always Campari or Aperol:
 a more traditional one with still white wine + sparkling water
 a more modern one with sparkling white wine + seltzer

Wines to be used 
It is important to say that the still white wine must be from the region, ditto if you choose sparkling white wine and sparkling water, contrary to the traditional recipe with still white wine.
Many types of wine are produced in the area of the province of Brescia but the DOC wines to be used are: Lugana (obviously only the dry still), Curtefranca white (Curtefranca bianco), Capriano del Colle white (Capriano del Colle bianco), as well as the IGT wines Valcamonica, Montenetto, Ronchi di Brescia.

Origin of the name 
The etymology of the name of this aperitif is somewhat uncertain. According to a certain anecdote that refers to oral traditions, the name pirlo may derive from the peculiar circular movement that the liqueur makes after falling into the wine. In the dialect, in fact, people usually say ‘ho fatto un pirlo’ (lit. I made a pirlo) when they fall, indeed, the idiom means ‘I fell’. The liqueur, while pouring into the glass, recalls a pirlo (a fall) going downwards and then returning upwards.

‘Pirlone’ 
The pirlone is nothing more than a double pirlo, often served in very big glasses. Pirlone, as a variant, became popular with the trend of the happy hour (in Italian ‘apericena’) characterised by abundant appetisers, for which a 'simple' pirlo may not be sufficient.

See also 
 Aperol Spritz

Italian alcoholic drinks
Cocktails with wine